Kalbe is a town in the Altmarkkreis Salzwedel (district), in Saxony-Anhalt, Germany. It is situated approximately 15 km north of Gardelegen, on the river Milde. To avoid confusion with Calbe, it is also called Kalbe an der Milde.

Kalbe an der Milde was the location of the World War II German Naval VLF Goliath transmitter complex.

Kalbe is home to D. Dornblüth & Sohn, a small luxury watch maker.

Geography 
The town Kalbe consists of the following Ortschaften or municipal divisions:

Altmersleben
Badel
Brunau
Engersen
Güssefeld
Jeetze
Jeggeleben
Kahrstedt
Kakerbeck
Kalbe (Milde)
Neuendorf am Damm
Packebusch
Vienau
Wernstedt
Winkelstedt
Zethlingen

References

 
Towns in Saxony-Anhalt
Altmarkkreis Salzwedel